Carlos Bravo may refer to:
Carlos Bravo (fencer) (born 1973), Venezuelan fencer
Carlos Bravo (footballer) (born 1993), Spanish footballer